Leaving L.A. is an American drama television series that aired on ABC from April 12 until June 14, 1997.

Premise
Drama with black humor about the Los Angeles County Coroner's office, where the employees examine the recently deceased.

Cast
Christopher Meloni as Reed
Melina Kanakaredes as Libby
Hilary Swank as Tiffany
Lorraine Toussaint as Dr. Chan
Billie Worley as Dudley
Anne Haney as Martha
Ron Rifkin as Neil

Episodes

References

External links
 
 

1997 American television series debuts
1997 American television series endings
1990s American drama television series
English-language television shows
American Broadcasting Company original programming
Television shows set in Los Angeles
Television series by Warner Bros. Television Studios
1990s American black comedy television series